Simon I (born 1210/15; died 8 April 1264), son of Gottfried III, was the first ruling count of Sponheim and the first in the Sponheim-Kreuznach line of the house of Sponheim. He was succeeded by his eldest son John I.

House of Sponheim
1210s births
1264 deaths